Dehydrating agent may refer to:
 a chemical compound used to drive a dehydration reaction
 a desiccant, a substance that absorbs moisture from its surroundings